Kim Wall may refer to:

 Kim Wall (actor), British actor
 Kim Wall (journalist) (1987–2017), Swedish freelance journalist, murder victim